Kittiwake is the name of two species of gull.  It may also refer to:

Aircraft
 Saunders Kittiwake, a Saunders Roe flying boat design
 Shapley Kittiwake, a British 1930s gull-wing monoplane
 Mitchell Kittiwake, a British single-engine sporting aircraft

Boats
 Kittiwake 23, an American sailboat design

Culture
 Kittiwake Island, a 1954 opera by Alec Wilder
 The Kittiwakes, a British folk band
 Kittiwake Press, a United Kingdom publisher: see List of publishers

Places
 Kittiwake Coast, a part of the coast of Newfoundland and Labrador
 Kittiwake oil field, an oil field in the North Sea: see List of oil and gas fields of the North Sea

Ships
 Kittiwake, a trawler, converted to the World War II minesweeper  of the United States Navy
 Kittiwake, an Irish light-vessel: see Lightvessels in Ireland
 , a Kingfisher-class sloop of the British Royal Navy, a 1930s patrol vessel
 , a United States Coast Guard Marine Protector-class coastal patrol boat: see List of United States Coast Guard cutters
 USFS Kittiwake, later US FWS Kittiwake, a fishery patrol vessel in the fleet of the United States Bureau of Fisheries and Fish and Wildlife Service fleets from 1919 to ca. 1945 that previously served in the United States Navy as 
 , a World War II submarine rescue ship of the United States Navy

Trains
 Kittiwake (60120), a LNER Peppercorn Class A1 British steam locomotive